Morez-e Bani Saleh (also Romanized as Moʿrez̤-e Banī Şāleḥ) is a village in Hoveyzeh Rural District, in the Central District of Hoveyzeh County, Khuzestan Province, Iran. At the 2006 census, its population was 386, in 59 families.

References 

Populated places in Hoveyzeh County